Czech cinema is the name for cinematography of Czech Republic, as well as the Czech cinematography while it was a part of other countries.

The Fabulous World of Jules Verne is considered the most internationally successful Czech film ever made; soon after its release it was distributed to 72 countries and received widespread attention. Domestically, the most viewed Czech film ever is The Proud Princess from 1952, which was seen by 8,222,695 people.

Marketa Lazarová was voted the all-time best Czech movie in a prestigious 1998 poll of Czech film critics and publicists.

History
The first Czech film director and cinematographer was Jan Kříženecký, who started filming short documentaries in Prague in the second half of 1898. The first permanent cinema house was founded by Viktor Ponrepo in 1907 in Prague.

Interwar period
Among the most prominent directors were Karel Lamač, Karl Anton, Svatopluk Innemann, Přemysl Pražský, Martin Frič and Gustav Machatý. The first Czechoslovak film fully made with synchronized sound is considered to be Když struny lkají, released in September 1930. Earlier film, Tonka of the Gallows, released in February 1930 was shot as a silent film and the sound was added in France. Barrandov Studios was launched by Miloš Havel in 1933, which started a Czech film industry film boom. It is the largest film studio in the country and one of the largest in Europe.

WW2
During WW2, many major pre-war film directors continued to make films, including Otakar Vávra, Martin Frič, Miroslav Cikán, Jan Sviták (who was murdered at the end of the war by an anti-fascist mob), Vladimír Slavínský, František Čáp, Zdeněk Gina Hašler (who emigrated to the USA after the war) and Václav Binovec.

Vladimír Čech started his career during the WW2, as well as Václav Krška. Scenario writer Karel Steklý turned to film directing at the end of the war and maintained both careers until his death.

Well-known actor Rudolf Hrušínský (born 1920) also tried himself as a director during this period.

After World War II
Many prominent people of Czech cinema left the country before World War II including directors Karel Lamač and Gustav Machatý, cinematographer Otto Heller, actors Hugo Haas and Jiří Voskovec and producer Josef Auerbach. Director Vladislav Vančura was murdered by Nazis as were a popular actor and signer Karel Hašler, actress Anna Letenská and writer Karel Poláček. Studio owner Miloš Havel and actresses Lída Baarová and Adina Mandlová went into exile in Germany or Austria after they were accused of collaborating with Nazis during the war. In 1943 Czech Film Archive (NFA) was established in Prague.

In 1945 the Czechoslovak film industry was nationalized. The most viewed Czech film ever, The Proud Princess, was released during this period, in 1952. It was seen by 8,222,695 people. The film also won a prize for a child film at Karlovy Vary International Film Festival.

Famous movies of the 50s include: Journey to the Beginning of Time, The Good Soldier Švejk, The Emperor and the Golem, The Princess with the Golden Star, The Fabulous World of Jules Verne, Proud Princess (the most viewed Czech film ever) and Once Upon a Time, There Was a King....

New Wave

The Czechoslovak New Wave is most frequently associated with the early works of directors such as Miloš Forman, Věra Chytilová, Jiří Menzel and others, although works by older, more established Czechoslovak directors such as Karel Kachyňa and Vojtěch Jasný are also placed in this category. Encompassing a broad range of works in the early to mid-1960s, the Czechoslovak New Wave cannot be pinned down to any one style or approach to filmmaking. Examples range from highly stylised, even avant-garde, literary adaptions using historical themes (e.g. Jan Němec's Diamonds of the Night (Démanty noci)) to semi-improvised comedies with contemporary subjects and amateur actors (e.g., Miloš Forman's The Firemen's Ball (Hoří, má panenko)). However, a frequent feature of films from this period were their absurd, black humour and an interest in the concerns of ordinary people, particularly when faced with larger historical or political changes. The acid western comedy film Lemonade Joe was a famous parody of old-time westerns. Cinematic influences included Italian neorealism and the French New Wave, although the Czechoslovak New Wave also builds organically on developments in Czechoslovak cinema in the late 1950s when the influence of Stalinism in the film industry declined.

1970s to 1989
Many of the directors active in the previous periods continued to work in this period, including Otakar Vávra and Jiří Menzel. During the period of normalization, only the movies that Czech authorities considered harmless were made. Therefore the most successful movies from this era are comedies, sci-fi and family movies, like in the previous periods. A fairy-tale film from 1973, Three Nuts for Cinderella has become a holiday classic in Czechoslovakia and several European countries, including Germany, Switzerland, Spain, Sweden and Norway.

1990s and beyond
Among the most successful Czech films made after the Velvet Revolution are: Kolya, Divided We Fall, Cosy Dens and Walking Too Fast.

Czech films
List of Czechoslovak films 1898–1990
List of Czech films (List of Czech Republic films) 1990–today
List of Czech animated films
List of Czech films considered the best
List of most expensive Czech films
List of highest-grossing Czech films

List of notable Czech directors

Karl Anton
Jiří Barta a stop-motion animation director
Hynek Bočan
František Čáp
Věra Chytilová
Miroslav Cikán
František Čáp
Vladimír Čech
Frank Daniel
Miloš Forman, twice won the Academy Award
Martin Frič
Saša Gedeon
Hugo Haas
Ladislav Helge
Juraj Herz
Jan Hřebejk
Svatopluk Innemann
Vojtěch Jasný
Jaromil Jireš
Pavel Juráček
Karel Kachyňa
Jan S. Kolár
Jiří Krejčík
Václav Krška
Karel Lamač
Oldřich Lipský
Gustav Machatý
Jiří Menzel, won the Academy Award
Jan Němec
Ivan Passer
Břetislav Pojar
Jindřich Polák
Přemysl Pražský
Alfred Radok
Karel Reisz, Czech-born British director
Josef Rovenský
Evald Schorm
Bohdan Sláma
Karel Steklý
Jan Sviták
Jan Švankmajer
Jan Svěrák, twice won the Academy Award
Jiří Trnka, puppet motion-picture animator
Hermína Týrlová
Otakar Vávra
František Vláčil, his Marketa Lazarová was voted the all-time best Czech movie
Václav Vorlíček
Jiří Weiss
Petr Zelenka
Karel Zeman

Nominations and Awards

Nominations for Academy Award for Best Foreign Language film
1965 - The Shop on Main Street by Ján Kadár and Elmar Klos - Won Academy Award for Best Foreign Language film
1966 - Loves of a Blonde by Miloš Forman
1967 - Closely Watched Trains by Jiří Menzel - Won Academy Award for Best Foreign Language film
1968 - The Firemen's Ball by Miloš Forman
1986 - My Sweet Little Village by Jiří Menzel
1991 - The Elementary School by Jan Svěrák
1996 - Kolya by Jan Svěrák - Won Academy Award for Best Foreign Language film
2000 - Divided We Fall
2003 - Želary by Ondřej Trojan

Contenders at Cannes Film Festival
1946 - Men Without Wings by František Čáp - Won Palm d'Or
1946 - Vánoční sen by Karel Zeman - Won Grand Prix International for best short fiction film
1946 - Springman and the SS by Jiří Trnka
1951 - The Trap by Martin Frič
1954 - A Drop Too Much by Břetislav Pojar - Won Best Puppet Film
1955 - Dog's Heads by Martin Frič
1955 - The Good Soldier Schweik by Jiří Trnka
1956 - Dalibor by Václav Krška
1956 - The Dolls of Jiří Trnka by Bruno Šefranka - Won Special Mention - Short Film
1957 - Lost Children by Miloš Makovec
1958 - Suburban Romance by Zbyněk Brynych
1958 - Než nám narostla křídla by Jiří Brdečka - Won Special Prize for Short Film
1959 - Desire by Vojtěch Jasný
1959 - Butterflies Don't Live Here by Miro Bernat - Won Palme d'Or for Best Short Film
1960 - When the Woman Butts In by Zdeněk Podskalský
1960 - Pozor  by Jiří Brdečka
1961 - Fantazie pro levou ruku a lidské svědomí by Pavel Hobl
1962 - Man in Outer Space by Oldřich Lipský
1962 - Člověk pod vodou by Jiří Brdečka
1963 - The Cassandra Cat by Vojtěch Jasný - Won Special Jury Prize
1963 - Železničáři by Evald Schorm
1964 - The Cry by Jaromil Jireš
1964 - Flora nese smrt by Jiří Papoušek
1965 - The Shop on Main Street by Ján Kadár and Elmar Klos - Won Special Mention for actors
1965 - Johann Sebastian Bach: Fantasy in G minor by Jan Švankmajer - Won Prix du Jury for Short Film
1966 - The Pipes by Vojtěch Jasný
1966 - Číslice by Pavel Procházka
1967 - Hotel for Strangers by Antonín Máša
1968 - A Report on the Party and the Guests by Jan Němec
1968 - The Firemen's Ball by Miloš Forman
1969 - End of a Priest by Evald Schorm
1969 - All My Compatriots by Vojtěch Jasný - Won Best Director
1969 - Moc osudu  by Jiří Brdečka
1970 - Fruit of Paradise by Věra Chytilová
1972 - Hvězda Betlémská by Hermína Týrlová
1974 - Leonarduv deník by Jan Švankmajer
1980 - Krychle by Zdeněk Smetana - Won Jury Prize for Short Film
1981 - Diskžokej by Jiří Barta
1981 - Král a skřítek by Lubomír Beneš
1989 - Manly Games by Jan Švankmajer
1990 - The Ear by Karel Kachyňa
1990 - Portrét by Pavel Koutský
1990 - Time of the Servants by Irena Pavlásková - Caméra d'Or - Special Mention

Contenders at Venice Film Festival
1934 - Ecstasy by Gustav Machatý - Won Best Director
1934 - The River by Josef Rovenský - Won Best Director
1934 - Bouře nad Tatrami by Tomáš Trnka - Won Best Director
1934 - Maryša by Josef Rovenský - Won Special Recommendation
1937 - Batalion by Miroslav Cikán - Won Special Recommendation
1939 - Humoreska by Otakar Vávra
1939 - Macoun the Tramp by Ladislav Brom
1939 - Sklenice i chléb by Jaroslav Tuzar
1940 - Muž z neznáma by Martin Frič
1941 - Nocturnal Butterfly by František Čáp - Won Targa di segnalazione
1947 - Capek's Tales by Martin Frič
1947 - The Czech Year by Jiří Trnka
1947 - The Strike by Karel Steklý - Won Golden Lion
1955 - From My Life by Václav Krška
1958 - The Wolf Trap by Jiří Weiss - Won New Cinema Award and FIPRESCI Prize
1963 - The Golden Fern by Jiří Weiss
1963 - Mud Covered City by Václav Táborský - Won Lion of San Marco for Best Documentary
1965 - Loves of a Blonde by Miloš Forman
1965 - Útěk do větru by Václav Táborský - Won Lion of San Marco
1966 - Ptáci koháci by Jiří Torman - Won Plate
1966 - Krtek a raketa by Zdeněk Miler - Won Recreative Children's Film
1969 - Čest a sláva by Hynek Bočan - Won Best Foreign Film
1981 - Cutting It Short by Jiří Menzel
1990 - Martha and I by Jiří Weiss
2019 - The Painted Bird by Václav Marhoul

Contenders at Moscow Film Festival
1935 - Workers, Let's Go by Martin Frič - Special jury prize for actors Jiří Voskovec and Jan Werich
1959 - Escape from the Shadows by Jiří Sequens - Golden Medal
1961 - Fetters by Karel Kachyňa
1963 - Death Is Called Engelchen by Ján Kadár and Elmar Klos - Golden Prize

See also

Czech Lion -  Annual awards of Czech Film and Television Academy
Barrandov Studios - Prague's film studios
Karlovy Vary International Film Festival
Finále Plzeň Film Festival - Film Festival of Czech and Slovak films
Film Festival Zlín - International Film Festival for Children and Youth
Ateliery Bonton Zlín - Animation Film Production Company
Czechoslovak New Wave
List of films Czech films considered the best
List of Czech Academy Award winners and nominees
Cinema of the world

Further reading

References

External links
GreenCine primer on Czech and Slovak Cinema
History of Czech cinematography
An article on places from Czech movies